Ricardo Tormo Blaya (September 7, 1952 – December 27, 1998) was a Spanish Grand Prix motorcycle road racer.

Biography
Tormo was born in the Spanish province of Valencia, in Ayacor, which is a small village dependent on Canals. When he was 8, his family moved into the center of Canals. Tormo won the  FIM 50cc world championship as a member of the Bultaco factory racing team. He was also a three-time 50cc Spanish national champion and a four-time 125cc national champion. His career was closely linked to that of Ángel Nieto, who was both a teammate and rival of Tormo.

In 1983, together with Jorge “Aspar” Martínez, Tormo signed with the Derbi factory to compete for the 1984 world championship in the new 80cc category. Tormo suffered an engine failure at the first race of the year at Misano. The second race of the season was to be held at Spain's Jarama Circuit.

At that time, there were only two official circuits in Spain, one in Jarama and the other in Calafat. The team planned test rides before the race, but both circuits were already booked, forcing them to practice in Martorelles. This region of Barcelona was an industrial park near the Derbi factory.  The team occasionally had test runs in this area, blocking off the roads to ensure that no cars would interfere with the racers. However, during a practice prior to the Spanish Grand Prix, a vehicle gained access to the area from one of the team's assistants who was supposed to have blocked off all of the roads. Tragically, Tormo, who was testing a new racing suit, hit the car and shattered his right leg. The accident marked the end of his racing career and the beginning of a countless series of operations.

In 1994, Tormo received Valencia's highest honor when he was given the Valencian Community's High Distinction award. In collaboration with the journalist Paco Desamparados, an autobiography was published, entitled "Yo Ricardo. Una vida por y para la moto". (I am Ricardo. A life by and for motorcycles). On December 27, 1998, Tormo died from leukemia, which he had been battling for many years. In his honor, Valencia's racetrack was renamed the Circuit de la Comunitat Valenciana Ricardo Tormo.

Images

Complete Grand Prix motorcycle racing results 
Points system from 1969 to 1987:

(key) (Races in bold indicate pole position; races in italics indicate fastest lap)

References

External links 

Ricardo Tormo's Circuit
 https://web.archive.org/web/20090506222853/http://www.portalmundos.com/mundomotormania/campeones/ricardotormo.htm
 http://www.lahoya.net/circuitodecheste/ricardo.html
 https://web.archive.org/web/20080801212254/http://reinodevalencia.com/2008/06/17/don-ricardo-tormo-blaya/

1952 births
1998 deaths
People from Costera
Sportspeople from the Province of Valencia
Spanish motorcycle racers
50cc World Championship riders
125cc World Championship riders
Deaths from leukemia